The Varsitarian (Varsi, The V, or V) is the official student publication of the University of Santo Tomas (UST). Founded in January 1928 by a group of students led by Jose Villa Panganiban, it is one of the first student newspapers in the Philippines. It is published fortnightly. The lampoon issue is called The Vuisitarian. Tomas U. Santos, the mascot of The Varsitarian, is a Thomasian who represents the students of the campus. He is usually seen accompanied by a talking, and quite cynical, T-square.

Aside from publishing the school paper, The Varsitarian holds the Inkblots national campus journalism fellowship, hosts the Cinevita Film Festival, and organizes the Pautakan, the longest-running campus-based quiz contest in the Philippines. It also organizes Ustetika, the country's longest-running university-based literary competition, and the Creative Writing Workshop, which celebrated its 10th year in 2014.

The Varsitarian also publishes other editorial supplements such as Montage, Tomasino, Breaktime, Amihan, and Botomasino.

History
The first issue of the Varsitarian came off the press on January 16, 1928, with Pablo Anido as the first editor in chief. However, the title of the "father of the Varsitarian" is given to Jose Villa Panganiban, who managed the day-to-day operations of the school paper. The other founders included Elizabeth C. Bowers and Olimpia Baltazar, a granddaughter of poet Francisco Baltazar. The paper cost 10 centavos, and was bought by 426 people out of a possible 2,000 students.

The Varsitarian co-founded the College Editors Guild of the Philippines on July 25, 1931 along with The GUIDON of the Ateneo de Manila, The Philippine Collegian of the University of the Philippines Diliman and The National of National University (Philippines).

Previously limited on publishing articles on university issues, the Varsitarian started reporting on national issues as well during the 1960s and 1970s.

Through the years, the pages of The Varsitarian would be graced by the likes of: Teodoro Valencia, Joe Guevarra, Felix Bautista, Jose Bautista, Joe Burgos, Antonio Siddayao, Jess Sison, Jullie Yap-Daza, Antonio Lopez, Rina Jimenez-David, Neal Cruz, A. O. Flores, Jake Macasaet, Fred Marquez, Mario Hernando, Alfredo Saulo, Alice Colet Villadolid, and Eugenia Duran-Apostol. The titans of Philippine literature learned writing in "the Varsitarian": Bienvenido Lumbera, F. Sionil José, Celso Al Carunungan, Ophelia Alcantara-Dimalanta, Paz Latorena, Cirilo Bautista, Federico Licsi Espino, Wilfrido Nolledo, Rogelio Sicat, Cristina Pantoja-Hidalgo, Norma Miraflor, Eric Gamalinda and Vim Nadera.

In March 2001, a Varsitarian article with information obtained from whistleblower Mark Welson Chua was published, detailing alleged corruption in the university's ROTC corps. While this led to the sacking of the commandant and his staff, Chua started receiving death threats. Chua's corpse was later found in the Pasig River, with the autopsy showing that he was still alive when he was dumped into the murky waters. This led Congress to legislate that all ROTC courses be made optional.

The Cultural Center of the Philippines' Encyclopedia for the Arts has an entry for The Varsitarian, the only school paper in the country to be listed.

Amid the national debate on the merits of the Reproductive Health bill, the Varsitarian published in September 2012 an editorial condemning the proposed law, and calling the professors from Ateneo de Manila University and De La Salle University who were in favor of the measure as " intellectual pretenders and interlopers." The editorial went viral and elicited various reactions among social media users. With feedback and reactions to the article turning out to be mostly negative, the paper's adviser issued an apology but added that such words were needed to deliver the message with emphasis. The university disowned the portion of the editorial that called the pro-RH bill professors "intellectual pretenders and interlopers," saying that while it supports the paper's opposition to the bill, that portion of the editorial "does not bear the university's imprimatur," as the paper is accorded editorial independence.

Extra-editorial activities
[[File:Varsi.jpg|thumb|200px|The Varsitarian'''s masthead on its 80th anniversary.]]

InkblotsThe Varsitarian hosts the annual Inkblots, a journalism workshop catered to campus journalism. The first Inkblots was held in 1999. In its 2011 edition, lecturers included musician and journalist Lourd de Veyra, Philippine Star columnist Quinito Henson, Manila Bulletin columnist Vim Nadera, GMA TV news reporter Cesar Apolinario, and GMANews.tv cartoonist Manix Abrera. In 2009, its lecturers were Apolinario, Philippine Daily Inquirer columnist Conrado de Quiros, Tempo entertainment editor Nestor Cuartero, and University of the Philippines vice president for public affairs Cristina Pantoja-Hidalgo, among others.

Cinevita
Starting from 2007, the paper hosts the Cinevita Film Festival, its annual film program. Its 2011 lineup included films Peñafrancia: Ikaw ang Pagibig by Marilou Diaz-Abaya and produced by the Dominican Order chronicling the life of Saint Dominic, Gil Portes's Two Funerals, Milo Tolentino's Andong, Blogog, Orasyon, P,  Demographic Winter, the winner of the UST Quadricentennial short film contest The 13th Day: The Story of Fatima, and The Rite.

PautakanThe Varsitarian'' organizes the Philippines' longest-running campus-based quiz contest called Pautakan. Almost all of the universities' constituent colleges and faculties participate in the event. The hosts for the 2011 event were former UAAP court side reporter Claude Despabiladeras, actor Dino Imperial and radio personality Andi Manzano.

Ustetika
Ustetika is the country's longest-running university-based literary competition, founded by Vim Nadera in 1986. It bestows UST's highest literary award for students, the Rector's Literary Award. In 1997, the 1st Parangal Hagbong was introduced during the 13th Ustetika Awards to pay tribute to two great Thomasian writers, Rolando Tinio and Rogelio Sicat.

Creative Writing Workshop
The Creative Writing Workshop, formerly the Fiction Workshop, started some time in 2004 and recently celebrated its 10th year in 2014. Its name was officially changed in its 9th year in 2013. It is an exclusive workshop facilitated by premier poets and fictionists for 12 to 16 Thomasians. Some of the panelists who graced the workshop include Mookie Katigbak-Lacuesta, Carlomar Daoana, Jun Cruz Reyes, Eros Atalia, Joselito Delos Reyes, Rebecca Añonuevo, and Vim Nadera.

References

External links

University of Santo Tomas
Student newspapers published in Metro Manila
Publications established in 1928